Ompong Galapong: May Ulo, Walang Tapon is a 1988 Filipino comedy film written and directed by Angel Labra and starring Dolphy and Redford White. Produced by Horizon Films, it was released on August 31, 1988. Critic Lav Diaz gave the film a negative review, criticizing the unfunny slapstick comedy and illogical situations.

Cast
Dolphy as Rodolfo "Ompong" Olimpio
Redford White as Robert
Chat Silayan as Ester
Berting Labra
Rommel Valdez as Rolly
Don Pepot
Ronel Victor as Miguel
Ria Baron as Neneng
Max Alvarado as Blackbeard
Bomber Moran
Mario Escudero as Mayor
Ruel Vernal
Angelo Ventura
Vic Varrion as Vice Mayor
Mely Tagasa as Miss R. Concepcion
Tatlong Itlog (Three Eggs)
Balot
Maning Bato
Fred Panopio
Isko
Romy Nario
Jing Caparas
Linda Castro
Pons de Guzman

Critical response
Lav Diaz, writing for the Manila Standard, gave Ompong Galapong a negative review, criticizing the film's illogical situations such as having a longtime lawyer for a deceitful mayor leave his client and walk at night to a dark place without any bodyguard or protection, only to easily be killed by a paid assassin. Diaz was also critical of the film's unfunny slapstick comedy, though he gave an exception to a scene involving Berting Labra's character playing ball, and concluded that it is an example of a film which uses numerous popular comedians but is still really lacking.

References

External links

1988 films
1988 comedy films
Cultural depictions of Blackbeard
Filipino-language films
Films set in psychiatric hospitals
Philippine comedy films